Paul Raines may refer to:
 J. Paul Raines (1964–2018), CEO of GameStop
 Paul Raines, a minor character in the television drama 24

See also
Paul Rains, member of the band Allo Darlin'